Liptena eketi, the small ochre liptena, is a butterfly in the family Lycaenidae. It is found in southern and eastern Nigeria and Cameroon.

References

Butterflies described in 1926
Liptena